Anton Sergeyevich Golotsutskov (born July 28, 1985) is a retired Russian gymnast.

He won two bronze medals (in floor and vault) at the 2008 Summer Olympics.

Competitive history

See also
List of Olympic male artistic gymnasts for Russia

References

External links
 

1985 births
Living people
People from Seversk
Russian male artistic gymnasts
Gymnasts at the 2004 Summer Olympics
Gymnasts at the 2008 Summer Olympics
Olympic gymnasts of Russia
Olympic bronze medalists for Russia
Medalists at the World Artistic Gymnastics Championships
Olympic medalists in gymnastics
Medalists at the 2008 Summer Olympics
European champions in gymnastics
Sportspeople from Tomsk Oblast
21st-century Russian people